National Colonization can refer to:

Colonization Societies to repatriate slaves, including National Colonization Society of America
A plan implemented by Australia's National Colonization Society; see History of South Australia
 The General Colonization Law, part of the 1824 Constitution of Mexico for claiming land in Mexican Texas for Mexico

See also
Colonization